This is a list of the mammal species recorded in Corsica, France.

The following tags are used to highlight each species' conservation status as assessed by the International Union for Conservation of Nature.

Subclass: Theria

Infraclass: Eutheria

Order: Rodentia (rodents)

Rodents make up the largest order of mammals, with over 40% of mammalian species. They have two incisors in the upper and lower jaw which grow continually and must be kept short by gnawing.

Suborder: Sciuromorpha
Family: Gliridae (dormice)
Subfamily: Glirinae
Genus: Glis
 Edible dormouse, G. glis 
Subfamily: Leithiinae
Genus: Eliomys
 Garden dormouse, E. quercinus 
Suborder: Myomorpha
Family: Muridae (mice and rats)
Subfamily: Murinae
Genus: Apodemus
 Wood mouse, A. sylvaticus 
Genus: Mus
 House mouse, M. musculus  introduced
Genus: Rattus
 Brown rat, R. norvegicus  introduced
 Black rat, R. rattus  introduced

Order: Lagomorpha (lagomorphs)

The lagomorphs comprise two families, Leporidae (hares and rabbits), and Ochotonidae (pikas). Though they can resemble rodents, and were classified as a superfamily in that order until the early 20th century, they have since been considered a separate order. They differ from rodents in a number of physical characteristics, such as having four incisors in the upper jaw rather than two.

Family: Leporidae (rabbits, hares)
Genus: Oryctolagus
 European rabbit, Oryctolagus cuniculus  introduced
Genus: Lepus
 Corsican hare, L. corsicanus 
 European hare, L. europaeus  introduced
Family: Ochotonidae (pikas)
Genus: Prolagus
Sardinian pika, P. sardus

Order: Erinaceomorpha (hedgehogs and gymnures)

The order Erinaceomorpha contains a single family, Erinaceidae, which comprise the hedgehogs and gymnures. The hedgehogs are easily recognised by their spines while gymnures look more like large rats.

Family: Erinaceidae (hedgehogs)
Subfamily: Erinaceinae
Genus: Erinaceus
 European hedgehog, Erinaceus europaeus

Order: Soricomorpha (shrews, moles, and solenodons)

The "shrew-forms" are insectivorous mammals. The shrews and solenodons closely resemble mice while the moles are stout bodied burrowers.

Family: Soricidae (shrews)
Subfamily: Crocidurinae
Genus: Crocidura
 Lesser white-toothed shrew, Crocidura suaveolens 
Genus: Suncus
 Etruscan shrew, Suncus etruscus

Order: Chiroptera (bats)

The bats' most distinguishing feature is that their forelimbs are developed as wings, making them the only mammals capable of flight. Bat species account for about 20% of all mammals.

Family: Miniopteridae (long-winged bats)
Subfamily: Miniopterinae
Genus: Miniopterus
 Common bent-wing bat, Minioterus schreibersii 
Family: Molossidae (free-tailed bats)
Subfamily: Molossinae
Genus: Tadarida
 European free-tailed bat, Tadarida teniotis 
Family: Rhinolophidae (horseshoe bats) 
Subfamily: Rhinolophinae
Genus: Rhinolophus
 Mediterranean horseshoe bat, Rhinolophus euryale 
 Greater horseshoe bat, Rhinolophus ferrumequinum 
 Lesser horseshoe bat, Rhinolophus hipposideros 
Family: Vespertilionidae (mouse-eared bats)
Subfamily: Myotinae
Genus: Myotis
 Bechstein's bat, Myotis bechsteinii 
 Long-fingered bat, Myotis capaccinii 
 Daubenton's bat, Myotis daubentonii 
 Geoffroy's bat, Myotis emarginatus 
 Whiskered bat, Myotis mystacinus 
 Natterer's bat, Myotis nattereri 
 Felten's myotis, Myotis punicus 
Subfamily: Verpertilioninae
Genus: Barbastella
 Barbastelle, Barbastella barbastellus 
Genus: Eptesicus
 Serotine bat, Eptesicus serotinus 
Genus: Hypsugo
 Savi's pipistrelle, Hypsugo savii 
Genus: Nyctalus
 Lesser noctule, Nyctalus leisleri 
Genus: Plecotus
 Grey long-eared bat, Plecotus austriacus 
Genus: Pipistrellus
 Kuhl's pipistrelle, Pipistrellus kuhlii 
 Nathusius's pipistrelle, Pipistrellus nathusii 
 Common pipistrelle, Pipistrellus pipistrellus 
 Soprano pipistrelle, Pipistrellus pygmaeus

Order: Cetacea (whales)

The order Cetacea includes whales, dolphins and porpoises. They are the mammals most fully adapted to aquatic life with a spindle-shaped nearly hairless body, protected by a thick layer of blubber, and forelimbs and tail modified to provide propulsion underwater.

Suborder: Mysticeti
Family: Balaenopteridae (rorquals)
Genus: Balaenoptera
 Common minke whale, Balaenoptera acutorostrata 
 Fin whale, Balaenoptera physalus 
Suborder: Odontoceti
Family: Delphinidae (dolphins and pilot whales)
Genus: Delphinus
 Short-beaked common dolphin, Delphinus delphis 
Genus: Grampus
 Risso's dolphin, Grampus griseus 
Genus: Globicephala
 Long-finned pilot whale, Globicephala melas 
Genus: Orcinus
 Killer whale, Orcinus orca 
Genus: Stenella
 Striped dolphin, Stenella coeruleoalba 
Genus: Steno
 Rough-toothed dolphin, Steno bredanensis 
Genus: Tursiops
 Common bottlenose dolphin, Tursiops truncatus 
Family: Physeteridae (sperm whales)
Genus: Physeter
 Sperm whale, Physeter macrocephalus 
Family: Ziphiidae (beaked whales)
Genus: Ziphius
 Cuvier's beaked whale, Ziphius cavirostris

Order: Carnivora (carnivorans)

There are over 260 species of carnivorans, the majority of which feed primarily on meat. They have a characteristic skull shape and dentition.

Suborder: Feliformia
Family: Felidae (cats)
Genus: Felis
 Wildcat, Felis silvestris 
Suborder: Caniformia
Family: Canidae (dogs, foxes, wolves)
Genus: Vulpes
 Red fox, Vulpes vulpes 
Family: Mustelidae (weasels)
Genus: Mustela
 Least weasel, Mustela nivalis 
Genus: Martes
 European pine marten, Martes martes 
Family: Phocidae (earless seals)
Genus: Monachus
Mediterranean monk seal, M. monachus  possibly extirpated

Order: Artiodactyla (even-toed ungulates)

The even-toed ungulates are ungulates whose weight is borne about equally by the third and fourth toes, rather than mostly or entirely by the third as in perissodactyls. There are about 220 artiodactyl species, including many that are of great economic importance to humans.

Family: Suidae (pigs)
Subfamily: Suinae
Genus: Sus
 Wild boar, S. scrofa 
Family: Bovidae (cattle, antelope, sheep, goats)
Subfamily: Caprinae
Genus: Ovis
 European mouflon, Ovis aries musimon
Family: Cervidae (deer)
Subfamily: Cervinae
Genus: Cervus
Red deer, C. elaphus 
Corsican red deer, C. e. corsicanus

Notes

References 
 Aulagnier, S. et al. (2008). Guide des mammifères d'Europe, d'Afrique du Nord et de Moyen-Orient. Delachaux et Niestlé, Paris
 Shirihai, H. & Jarrett, B. (2006). Whales, Dolphins and Seals: A Field Guide to the Marine Mammals of the World. A & C Black, London

See also 
 List of chordate orders
 Lists of mammals by region
 List of prehistoric mammals
 Mammal classification
 List of mammals described in the 2000s

Corsica
Corsica